Farooq Kathwari (born 1944) is a Kashmiri-American businessman who is currently the CEO of Ethan Allen.

Life 
Kathwari moved to the United States from the capital Srinagar of Kashmir in 1965. He is the Chairman, President and Chief Executive officer of Ethan Allen Interiors Inc. He has been president of the Company since 1985 and Chairman and Chief Executive Officer since 1987. In 1989, he formed a group to purchase Ethan Allen and took the Company public in 1993. Under Kathwari’s leadership, Ethan Allen has been transformed into a leading manufacturer and retailer of home furnishings in the United States

In 2016, Kathwari became co-chair of the Muslim-Jewish Advisory Council, an organization founded to address anti-Muslim and anti-Jewish bigotry in the United States.

Personal life 
Kathwari is Kashmiri. His family is from Srinagar, Kashmir. He had 2 sons, Irfan, who died fighting in the Afghan Civil War in 1992, and Omar as well as a daughter, Farrah. He lives in New Rochelle, New York.

References 

1944 births
American people of Indian descent
American Muslims
American people of Kashmiri descent
Living people
Businesspeople from New Rochelle, New York
Indian emigrants to the United States
The Stimson Center
20th-century American businesspeople
21st-century American businesspeople